The 1988 season was Molde's 14th season in the top flight of Norwegian football. This season Molde competed in 1. divisjon (first tier), the Norwegian Cup and the 1988–89 UEFA Cup.

In the league, Molde finished in 3rd position, 8 points behind winners Rosenborg. 

Molde participated in the 1988 Norwegian Cup. They reached the quarter-finals where they drew rivals Rosenborg. Molde lost the game at Molde Stadion 1–2 after extra time and were eliminated from the competition.

Squad
Source:

Friendlies

Competitions

1. divisjon

Results summary

Positions by round

Results

League table

Norwegian Cup

UEFA Cup

Squad statistics

Appearances and goals
Lacking information:
Appearance statistics (8–10 players) and goalscorer from Norwegian Cup quarter-finals are missing.

 

 

 

 
 
 
|}

Goalscorers

See also
Molde FK seasons

References

External links
nifs.no

1988
Molde